Chiara Navarrini  (born ) is a retired Italian volleyball player. She was part of the Italy women's national volleyball team.

She participated in the 1994 FIVB Volleyball Women's World Championship, and at the 1997 Women's European Volleyball Championship. On club level she played with Teodora Ravenna.

Clubs
 Teodora Ravenna (1994)

References

1976 births
Living people
Italian women's volleyball players
Place of birth missing (living people)